Aizaz Rizvi was a leader of Bharatiya Janata Party from Uttar Pradesh. He was a member of Uttar Pradesh Legislative Council. Rizvi served as cabinet minister in the ministry headed by Kalyan Singh in 1991–92. He was journalist by profession. He is the father of the former  leader of Bharatiya Janata Party Seema Rizvi.

References

State cabinet ministers of Uttar Pradesh
Uttar Pradesh MLAs 1991–1993
Bharatiya Janata Party politicians from Uttar Pradesh
1998 deaths
Indian Shia Muslims
Politicians from Lucknow
Year of birth missing